Takashi Kondo (29 October 1911 – 23 January 1994) was a Japanese gymnast. He competed in four events at the 1932 Summer Olympics.

References

External links
 

1911 births
1994 deaths
Japanese male artistic gymnasts
Olympic gymnasts of Japan
Gymnasts at the 1932 Summer Olympics
Gymnasts from Tokyo
20th-century Japanese people